"Another You" is a song by Dutch DJ and record producer Armin van Buuren. It  features the vocals from Dutch singer Mr. Probz. The song was released on 8 May 2015 by Armada Music, as the first single from Armin van Buuren's sixth studio album, Embrace. "Another You" became both Armin van Buuren and Mr. Probz's fourth top 10 hit on the Single Top 100 chart in the Netherlands.

Track listing
Digital download
"Another You" (featuring Mr. Probz) (radio edit) – 3:12

Digital download
"Another You" (featuring Mr. Probz) (extended mix) – 4:54
"Another You" (featuring Mr. Probz) (Mark Sixma radio edit) – 3:41
"Another You" (featuring Mr. Probz) (Mark Sixma remix) – 4:41
"Another You" (featuring Mr. Probz) (Ronski Speed remix) – 7:53

Digital download – remix
"Another You" (featuring Mr Probz) (Headhunterz radio edit) – 3:07

Digital download – remix
"Another You" (featuring Mr Probz) (Headhunterz remix) – 4:49

CD single
"Another You" (featuring Mr. Probz) (radio edit) – 3:12
"Another You" (featuring Mr. Probz) (Mark Sixma radio edit) – 3:41
"Another You" (featuring Mr. Probz) (extended mix) – 4:54
"Another You" (featuring Mr. Probz) (Mark Sixma remix) – 4:41

Charts

Weekly charts

Year-end charts

Certifications

References

2015 singles
2015 songs
Armin van Buuren songs
Songs written by Armin van Buuren
Songs written by Benno de Goeij